Tonks is a surname. Notable people with the surname include:
 
Benjamin Tonks (1832-1884), New Zealand politician
Dick Tonks (born 1951), New Zealand rower 
Greig Tonks (born 1989), Scottish rugby union player 
Henry Tonks (1862-1937), English surgeon and artist
Horace Norman Vincent Tonks (1891-1959), Anglican bishop
Les Tonks (1942–2017), English rugby league footballer of the 1960s and 1970s
Lewi Tonks (1897-1971), American quantum physicist
Oliver Samuel Tonks (1874-1953), American art historian
Rosemary Tonks (1932-2014), English author and poet
Tony Tonks (born 1985), English rugby player

Fictional characters:

From the Harry Potter franchise:
Andromeda Tonks
Nymphadora Tonks
Ted Tonks